Nehemie Benoudjita was a Chadian journalist. He was born on March 21, 1945 at Dorro (Chad). He completed his higher studies in Paris. He hold a Master in Political Science at the University of Paris 8, Vincennes. For a long time in France, he was an activist for human rights movements. He was father of two.

In 1993, he returned to his home country. He created and managed an independent newspapers: “Le Temps”, in which there was a weekly column for democracy and human rights. Chad, has an authoritarian regime. So, many articles of the newspapers "Le Temps" are subject to regular government persecution, and its director also.

In 1998, he received the "Maître Joseph Behidi" Prize as the League of Human Rights in Chad awarded to defenders of rights and freedom in Africa.

On September 29, 1999, Nehemie Benoudjita died at the military hospital of N'djamena.

In 2007, La maison de Nehemyah, an organization specialized in services for sick children, especially, those who suffer from HIV/AIDS, was created in his memory at Nehemyah's home.

Chadian journalists
1945 births
1999 deaths
People from Moyen-Chari Region
20th-century journalists